"Cooky Puss" is the debut single by Beastie Boys. The song is their first hip hop recording, their first release featuring band member Adam Horovitz, and their final release to feature drummer Kate Schellenbach. It was released in 1983 as a 12-inch single on Rat Cage Records. The title, title track, and lyrics are satirical references to the Cookie Puss ice cream dessert.

All 4 tracks, along with the entire Polly Wog Stew EP, appear on the compilation album Some Old Bullshit.

The title track samples Steve Martin's "My Real Name" from his 1978 album A Wild and Crazy Guy, as well as Beastie Boys' own "Beastie Boys" and "Transit Cop" from Polly Wog Stew. It also contains parts of various prank calls from the group to a local Carvel retailer.

The airline corporation British Airways used a portion of "Beastie Revolution" (chosen by Jeremy Healy without the band's permission) in one of their television ads; the Beastie Boys contacted a lawyer and successfully sued British Airways for $40,000. This money was then used to rent an apartment at 59 Chrystie Street in Chinatown, New York City. This apartment was used not only as a place to live but also as a place for the group to rehearse and record. The group later thanked Jeremy Healy as he unwittingly kick-started their career via the money they won in the lawsuit. The apartment was remembered in "59 Chrystie Street," a song on 1989's Paul's Boutique LP.

Track listing 
Side A (listed as This Side)
 "Cooky Puss" – 3:12
 "Bonus Batter" – 2:15
Side B (listed as That Side)
 "Beastie Revolution" – 5:00
 "Cooky Puss" (censored version) – 3:12

References 

1983 debut singles
Beastie Boys songs
1983 songs
Songs written by Ad-Rock
Songs written by Mike D
Songs written by Kate Schellenbach
Songs written by Adam Yauch